The Browns River Covered Bridge, also called the Westford Covered Bridge, is a covered bridge that crosses Browns River off State Route 128 in Westford, Vermont.

The bridge is of Burr arch design by an unknown builder.

Recent history
The bridge was closed to traffic in the 1960s, and was bypassed by a concrete bridge alongside.  In 1976 some repair work was done by the Vermont Naval Reserve and volunteers from the town.  But even that work was not enough and the bridge was closed to even foot traffic.  In 1987 the firm of Graton Associates was hired to rehabilitate the bridge.  The ensuing work was filmed by a crew from National Geographic doing a piece on Milton Graton's life as a bridge restorer.  The bridge was rededicated in 2001, although it remains closed to motor traffic at this time.

The article found at The Browns River Bridge - a Covered Bridge Preservation Story has a very comprehensive recounting of the work performed.

See also
List of covered bridges in Vermont

References

1838 establishments in Vermont
Bridges completed in 1838
Bridges in Chittenden County, Vermont
Buildings and structures in Westford, Vermont
Burr Truss bridges in the United States
Covered bridges in Vermont
Former road bridges in the United States
Pedestrian bridges in Vermont
Road bridges in Vermont
Tourist attractions in Chittenden County, Vermont
Wooden bridges in Vermont